The Panama Bay is a large body of water off the coast of southern Panama, at . It is a part of the greater Gulf of Panama.

Pollution Problems 
The Panama Bay is considered to be in an eutrophic state by the World Resources Institute. This is a result of ongoing pollution from agricultural and livestock operations. Urban wastewater from nearby Panama City has also contributed to the eutrophication of Panama Bay.

See also
Matasnillo River

References

Bays of Panama
Gulf of Panama
Panama City
Panamanian coasts of the Pacific Ocean
Ramsar sites in Panama